Victoria Shelia (born 10 March 2000) is a Georgian rhythmic gymnast.

Personal life
Viktoria is an only child. Besides her mother tongue of Georgian she speaks Russian, English and Spanish. Her father is a well-known Georgian former footballer, Murtaz Shelia.

Junior career
As a junior Shelia has competed at 2014 European Championships in Baku.

Senior career
Shelia became a senior in 2016 and made her international debut. She competed at the 2016 Berlin World Challenge Cup, finishing 19th in the all-around qualifier with a score of 64.100.  At the 2016 Baku World Challenge Cup, Shelia advanced to the all-around final and finished in 16th place with a score of 67.700. 

In 2017, Shelia competed at the European Championships in Budapest, the Tashkent World Challenge Cup and the Baku World Challenge Cup.

References

External links
 
 

2000 births
Living people
Rhythmic gymnasts from Georgia (country)
Sportspeople from Tbilisi